Aadaminte Vaariyellu is a 1984 Malayalam film directed by K. G. George, starring Mammootty, Srividya, Suhasini and Soorya. The film handles issues of women.The filim considered as one of the best classic filim in Malayalam film industry.

Plot
Vasanthi has to mother three generations of her family in addition to her daytime job. She finds liberation by escaping into madness and a mental asylum. Alice is married to a ruthless businessman and seeks solace in affairs. When she is refused a divorce, she commits suicide. When both the middle-class women prefer self-destruction as their way to liberation, the third, a brutally exploited housemaid, Ammini ends up in a home for women, but later helps all the inmates of this home to break out of the suffocating atmosphere of the home to freedom.

Cast

Srividya as Alice
Soorya as Ammini
Suhasini as Vasanthy
Mammootty as Jose
Venu Nagavally as Gopi
Bharath Gopi as Mamachan
Thilakan as Purushothaman Nair
Mohan Jose as Chakkunni
Rugmini
K. Ramachandrababu
Latheef as Hassan Koya
Gladis as Saramma
KPAC Sunny as Eeppachan
Lalithasree as Ponnamma
R. K. Nair
Rajam K. Nair as Gauri
T. M. Abraham as Verghese
Sabu Oommen as Mahesh Kumar

Soundtrack
The music was composed by M. B. Sreenivasan and the lyrics were written by O. N. V. Kurup.

References

External links
 

1980s Malayalam-language films
1983 drama films
1983 films
Films about women in India
Films directed by K. G. George
Indian drama films
1984 drama films
1984 films